Polysyndeton (from Ancient Greek πολύ poly, meaning "many", and συνδετόν syndeton, meaning "bound together with".) is the deliberate insertion of  conjunctions into a sentence for the purpose of "slow[ing] up the rhythm of the prose" so as to produce "an impressively solemn note."

In grammar, a polysyndetic coordination is a coordination in which all conjuncts are linked by coordinating conjunctions (usually and, but, or, nor in English).

Examples
A passage from the Book of Genesis (1:24–25) exemplifies the stately effect of polysyndeton: 

Author Ernest Hemingway employs the conjunction "and" to convey "a flow and continuity of experience" in a passage from his short story "After the Storm":

The poet John Keats used conjunctions in a verse from "Endymion":

In the King James Bible
Polysyndeton is used extensively in the King James Version of the Bible, where and is used as a literal translation of the Hebrew waw-consecutive and the Ancient Greek particle δέ. For example:

 "And every living substance was destroyed which was upon the face of the ground, both man, and cattle, and the creeping things, and the fowl of the heaven; and they were destroyed from the earth: and Noah only remained alive, and they that were with him in the ark." (Genesis 7:22–24)
 "Or if a soul touch any unclean thing, whether it be a carcass of an unclean beast, or a carcass of unclean cattle, or the carcass of unclean creeping things, and if it be hidden from him; he also shall be unclean, and guilty." (Leviticus 5:2)
 "And Joshua, and all of Israel with him, took Achan the son of Zerah, and the silver, and the garment, and the wedge of gold, and his sons, and his daughters, and his oxen, and his asses, and his sheep, and his tent, and all that he had." (Joshua 7.24)

In Shakespeare 
Shakespeare used polysyndeton:
 "When thou dost ask me blessing I'll kneel down and ask of thee forgiveness. So we'll live and pray, and sing, and tell old tales, and laugh at gilded butterflies, and hear poor rogues talk of court news, and we'll talk with them too" (King Lear 5.3.11–5)
 "Why, this is not a boon! 'Tis as I should entreat you to wear your gloves, or feed on nourishing dishes, or keep you warm, or sue you to do a peculiar profit to your person" (Othello 3.3.85–9)
 "If there be cords, or knives, or poison, or fire, or suffocating streams, I'll not endure it" (Othello 3.3.443–5)
 "Though his face be better than any man's, yet his leg excels all men's, and for a hand and a foot and a body, though they be not to be talked on, yet they are past compare" (Romeo and Juliet 2.5.42–5)
 "Your love says, like an honest gentleman, and a courteous, and a kind, and a handsome, and, I warrant, a virtuous-where is your mother?" (Romeo and Juliet 2.5.59–61)

Modern usage
Modern writers have also used the technique:

 "There were frowzy fields, and cow-houses, and dunghills, and dustheaps, and ditches, and gardens, and summer-houses, and carpet-beating grounds, at the very door of the Railway. Little tumuli of oyster shells in the oyster season, and of lobster shells in the lobster season, and of broken crockery and faded cabbage leaves in all seasons, encroached upon its high places." (Charles Dickens, Dombey and Son, 1848)
 "Papa O. never knocked. He kicked the door in happily and shouted cheerfully, 'What you say, all peoples? How's t'ings, ever-body?' Papa O. pulled people out of bed and rattled pans and laughed at nothing and argued with unseen bartenders until somebody gave him sausage and eggs and coffee and bread and hung the accordion safely away." (Nelson Algren, "How the Devil Came Down Division Street", 1944, in The Neon Wilderness, 1947)
 "Let the whitefolks have their money and power and segregation and sarcasm and big houses and schools and lawns like carpets, and books, and mostly—mostly—let them have their whiteness." (Maya Angelou, I Know Why the Caged Bird Sings, 1969)
 "Nor was it there because the person had been killed, or maimed or caught or burned or jailed or whipped or evicted or stomped or raped or cheated, since that could hardly qualify as news in a newspaper." (Toni Morrison, Beloved, 1987)
 "Mass hysteria is a terrible force, yet New Yorkers seem always to escape it by some tiny margin: they sit in stalled subways without claustrophobia, they extricate themselves from panic situations by some lucky wisecrack, they meet confusion and congestion with patience and grit—a sort of perpetual muddling through. Every facility is inadequate—the hospitals and schools and the playgrounds are overcrowded, the express highways are feverish, the unimproved highways and bridges are bottlenecks, there is not enough air and not enough light, and there is usually either too much heat or too little. But the city makes up for its hazards and its deficiencies by supplying its citizens with massive doses of a supplementary vitamin: the sense of belonging to something unique, cosmopolitan, mighty, and unparalleled." (E.B. White, "Here is New York," 1949)

In Cormac McCarthy
Cormac McCarthy uses polysyndeton extensively throughout his ten novels (1965–2006), especially "and" to replace an increasing number of commas. (By The Border Trilogy, commas are mostly used between unquoted voices and narration, as in: "Bring it here, he said.") Examples from each novel:

 Then the barrel of the gun shortening and withdrawing in the cup of his shoulder and his face bent to the stock and him walking into it, the black plume of smoke forming soundlessly about the muzzle and the shot popping into his leg, audible and painless in his flesh and him taking another step with the same leg and pitching forward as if he had stepped in a hole and then he could hear the shot. [...] The first night he built his fire and was sitting by it with his shotgun leaning against a tree and was sipping coffee from a canteen cup [...] (The Orchard Keeper, 1965)
 Now the entire herd had begun to wheel wider and faster along the bluff and the outermost ranks swung centrifugally over the escarpment row on row wailing and squealing and above this the howls and curses of the drovers that now up-reared in the moil of flesh they tended and swept with dust had begun to assume satanic looks with their staves and wild eyes as if they were no true swineherds but disciples of darkness got among these charges to herd them to their doom. [...] The hogs boiled past squealing and plunging and the chalky red smoke of their passage hung over the river and stained the sky with something of sunset. [...] He was dressed in a dusty frockcoat and carried a walking stick and he wore a pair of octagonal glasses on the one pane of which the late sun shone while a watery eye peered from the naked wire aperture of the other. (Outer Dark, 1968)
 They passed under flowering appletrees and passed a log crib chinked with orange mud and forded a branch and came in sight of an aged clapboard house that stood in blue shade under the wall of the mountain. [...] Kirby turned his head to one side and gripped his nose between his thumb and forefinger and sneezed a gout of yellow snot into the grass and wiped his fingers on the knee of his jeans. (Child of God, 1973)
 Suttree looked at the ground and smiled and wiped his mouth with the back of his wrist and looked up again. [...] The skiff bobbed and slid heavily and the bilgewater surged. [...] Suttree stretched and rubbed his back and eyed the sun. It was already very hot. He went along the deck and pushed open the door and entered. (Suttree, 1979)
 The horse screamed and reared and the Apache struggled to keep his seat and drew his sword and found himself staring into the black lemniscate that was the paired bores of Glanton's doublerifle. [...] Dust stanched the wet and naked heads of the scalped who with the fringe of hair below their wounds and tonsured to the bone now lay like maimed and naked monks in the bloodslaked dust and everywhere the dying groaned and gibbered and the horses lay screaming. [...] The judge wrote on and then he folded the ledger shut and laid it to one side and pressed his hands together and passed them down over his nose and mouth and placed them palm down on his knees. [...] He bows to the fiddlers and sashays backwards and throws back his head and laughs deep in his throat and he is a great favorite, the judge. He wafts his hat and the lunar dome of his skull passes palely under the lamps and he swings about and takes possession of one of the fiddles and he pirouettes and makes a pass, two passes, dancing and fiddling at once. (Blood Meridian, 1985)
 The mouths of the cans were lensed with tinted cellophane and they cast upon the sheeting a shadowplay in the lights and smoke of antic demon players and a pair of goshawks arched chittering through the partial darkness overhead. (All the Pretty Horses, 1992)
 They were running on the plain harrying the antelope and the antelope moved like phantoms in the snow and circled and wheeled and the dry powder blew about them in the cold moonlight and their breath smoked palely in the cold as if they burned with some inner fire and the wolves twisted and turned and leapt in a silence such that they seemed of another world entire. (The Crossing, 1994)
 They stood in the doorway and stomped the rain from their boots and swung their hats and wiped the water from their faces. [...] They stomped their boots again and crossed to the bar and stood and thumbed back their hats and propped their boots on the rail above the tiled drainway while the barman poured their whiskies. In the bloodred barlight and the drifting smoke they raised their glasses briefly and nodded as if to salute some fourth companion now lost to them and they tilted back the shots and set the empty glasses on the bar again and wiped their mouths with the backs of their hands. (Cities of the Plain, 1998)
 The deputy left Chigurh standing in the corner of the office with his hands cuffed behind him while he sat in the swivelchair and took off his hat and put his feet up and called Lamar on the mobile. [...] He dropped his cuffed hands over the deputy's head and leaped into the air and slammed both knees against the back of the deputy's neck and hauled back on the chain. (No Country for Old Men, 2005)
 Out on the road the pilgrims sank down and fell over and died and the bleak and shrouded earth went trundling past the sun and returned again as trackless and as unremarked as the path of any nameless sisterworld in the ancient dark beyond. (The Road, 2006)

In film 
 "But all you have to do is knock on any door and say, 'If you let me in, I'll live the way you want me to live, and I'll think the way you want me to think,' and all the blinds'll go up and all the windows will open, and you'll never be lonely, ever again." (Inherit the Wind, 1960, Spencer Tracy as "Henry Drummond")
 "And the Germans will not be able to help themselves from imagining the cruelty their brothers endured at our hands, and our boot heels, and the edge of our knives. And the Germans will be sickened by us. And the Germans will talk about us. And the Germans will fear us. And when the Germans close their eyes at night, and their subconscious tortures them for the evil they’ve done, it will be with thoughts of us that they are tortured with." (Inglourious Basterds, 2009, Brad Pitt as "Lieutenant Aldo Raine")
 Monty Python and the Holy Grail parodies the biblical writing style using polysyndeton:And Saint Attila raised the hand grenade up on high, saying, "O Lord, bless this thy hand grenade, that with it thou mayst blow thine enemies to tiny bits, in thy mercy." And the Lord did grin. And the people did feast upon the lambs, and sloths, and carp, and anchovies, and orangutans, and breakfast cereals, and fruit bats, and large chu[...]

Antonym
It can be contrasted with asyndeton, which is a coordination containing no conjunctions often manipulating the rhythm of a passage in the attempt to make a thought more memorable, and syndeton, which is a coordination with one conjunction.

Two examples of asyndeton:

 "Veni, vidi, vici" (Julius Caesar)
 "We shall pay any price, bear any burden, meet any hardships, support any friend, oppose any foe to assure the survival and the success of liberty." (John F. Kennedy, inaugural address, 1961)

An example of syndeton:

 "You are talking to a man who has laughed in the face of death, sneered at doom, and chuckled at catastrophe". (The Wizard in The Wizard of Oz, 1939)

Citations

General and cited sources 
 Baldrick, Chris. 2008. Oxford Dictionary of Literary Terms. Oxford University Press. New York. 
 Corbett, Edward P. J. and Connors, Robert J. 1999. Style and Statement. Oxford University Press. New York, Oxford. 
 Forsyth, Mark. 2014. The Elements of Eloquence. Berkley Publishing Group/Penguin Publishing. New York.

External links

 Audio illustrations of polysyndeton

Figures of speech
Grammar
Rhetoric